The Battle of Caporetto (also known as the Twelfth Battle of the Isonzo, the Battle of Kobarid or the Battle of Karfreit) was a battle on the Italian front of World War I.

The battle was fought between the Kingdom of Italy and the Central Powers and took place from 24 October to 19 November 1917, near the town of Kobarid (now in north-western Slovenia, then part of the Austrian Littoral). The battle was named after the Italian name of the town (also known as Karfreit in German).

Austro-Hungarian forces, reinforced by German units, were able to break into the Italian front line and rout the Italian forces opposing them. The battle was a demonstration of the effectiveness of the use of stormtroopers and the infiltration tactics developed in part by Oskar von Hutier. The use of poison gas by the Germans also played a key role in the collapse of the Italian Second Army.

The rest of the Italian Army retreated  to the Piave River, its effective strength declined from 1,800,000 troops down to 1,000,000 and the government of Paolo Boselli collapsed.

Prelude

 Throughout the spring and summer of 1917, the Italians had launched numerous offensives on the Austro-Hungarian Lines in the Isonzo Sector, with the 11th Battle of the Isonzo being the most successful in pushing back the Austro-Hungarians. After the Italian success in the 11th Battle of the Isonzo, Emperor Karl knew a breakthrough was going to happen at any moment, as both the Austro-Hungarians and Italians were exhausted, and running out of men to sustain the war. So, he wrote to Kaiser Wilhelm II and requested that German forces be deployed to Italy.
In August 1917 Paul von Hindenburg and Arthur Arz von Straußenburg decided to send troops from the Eastern Front to the Isonzo Sector. Erich Ludendorff was opposed to this but was overruled. Later, in September three experts from the Imperial General Staff, led by the chemist Otto Hahn, went to the Isonzo front to find a site suitable for a gas attack. They proposed attacking the quiet Caporetto sector, where a good road ran west through a mountain valley to the Venetian Plain. The Germans also sent Lieutenant General Konrad Krafft von Dellmensingen, an expert in mountain warfare to reconnoitre the ground.

The Austro-Hungarian Army Group Boroević, commanded by Svetozar Boroević, was prepared for the offensive. In addition, a new 14th Army was formed with nine Austrian and six to eight German divisions, which were commanded by the German Otto von Below. The German divisions were Ludendorff's general reserve. Lieutenant Colonel Georg Wetzell, Ludendorff's strategic adviser, advised Ludendorff to use the German divisions to attack a weakpoint in the Italian line. The Italians inadvertently helped by providing weather information over their radio.

The German and Austro-Hungarian battle plan was to use Otto von Below's German divisions, which would be guided by Konrad Krafft to attack a part of the Julian Alps which was near the northeastern corner of the Venetian salient. Meanwhile, Svetozar's Austro-Hungarian army would attack the eastern end of the salient and a stretch of ground near the Adriatic shore.

The buildup of German and Austro-Hungarian military forces in the region was noticed by Italian air reconnaissance.

Battle

Foul weather, as well as lack of readiness in some of the Austro-Hungarian divisions and in particular of their artillery, delayed the attack for two days but on 24 October there was no wind and the front was misted over. At 02:00, in the northern area of the battle (near Bovec/Plezzo) 894 metal tubes similar to Livens Projectors, dug into a reverse slope, were triggered electrically to simultaneously fire canisters containing  of chlorine-arsenic agent and diphosgene, smothering the Italian trenches in a dense cloud of poison gas. Knowing that their gas masks could protect them only for two hours or less, the defenders fled, though 500–600 were still killed. Other parts of the valley were bombed with gas from common grenades. Then the front was quiet until 06:00, when all the Italian wire and trenches to be attacked were bombarded by mortars.

At 06:41, 2,200 guns opened fire, many targeting the valley road along which reserves were advancing to plug the gap. At 08:00 two large mines were detonated under strong points on the heights bordering the valley and the infantry attacked. Soon they penetrated the almost undefended Italian fortifications in the valley, breaching the defensive line of the Italian Second Army between the IV and XXVII Corps. To protect the attackers' flanks, Alpine Troops infiltrated the strong points and batteries along the crests of the adjoining ridges, Matajur and Kolovrat, laying out their telephone lines as they advanced to maintain contact with their artillery. Specially-trained and equipped stormtrooper units led attacks, making good use of the new German model 08/15 Maxim light machine gun, light trench mortars, mountain guns, flamethrowers and hand grenades.

The attackers in the valley marched almost unopposed along the excellent road toward Italy, some advanced  on the first day. The Italian army beat back the attackers on either side of the sector where the central column attacked, but von Below's successful central penetration threw the entire Italian army into disarray. Forces had to be moved along the Italian front in an attempt to stem von Below's breakout, but this only weakened other points along the line and invited further attacks. At this point, the entire Italian position was threatened.

The Italian 2nd Army commander Luigi Capello was bedridden with fever. Recognizing that his forces were ill-prepared for this attack and were being routed, Capello requested permission to withdraw to the Tagliamento. Cadorna, who believed the Italian force could regroup and hold out, denied the request. Finally, on 30 October 1917, Cadorna ordered the majority of the Italian force to retreat to the other side of the Tagliamento. It took the Italians four full days to cross the river, and by this time the German and Austro-Hungarian armies were on their heels, ambushing the defenders whenever they could. These ambushes would become known as the Battle of Pozzuolo. Eventually, the retreating Italian soldiers were able to break through the Austro-German encirclement and retreat to the Tagliamento River. Then, on 2 November, after Captain Emil Redl's 4th Battalion of the 4th Bosnian Infantry Regiment attack, the 55th Infantry Division (Austria-Hungary) established a bridgehead across the Tagliamento River. About this time, however, the rapid success of the attack caught up with them. The German and Austro-Hungarian supply lines were stretched to the breaking point and unable to launch another attack to isolate a part of the Italian army against the Adriatic. Cadorna was able to retreat further and by 10 November had established a position on the Piave River and Monte Grappa.

Even before the battle, Germany was struggling to feed and supply its armies in the field. Erwin Rommel, who as a junior officer won the Pour le Mérite for his accomplishments in the battle, often bemoaned the demands placed upon his "poorly fed troops". The Allied blockade of the German Empire, which the Kaiserliche Marine had been unable to break, had led to food shortages and widespread malnutrition in Germany and the Central Powers in general. The inadequate provisioning, as well as the grueling night marches preliminary to the Battle of Caporetto, took a toll on the German and Austro-Hungarian forces. Despite these logistical problems, the initial assault was extremely successful. However, as the area controlled by the combined Central Powers forces expanded, an already limited logistical capacity was overstrained. By the time the attack reached the Piave, the soldiers of the Central Powers were running low on supplies and were feeling the effects of exhaustion. As the Italians began to counter the pressure put on them, the German forces lost momentum and were once again caught up in another round of attrition warfare.

Aftermath

Analysis
Brian R. Sullivan called Caporetto "the greatest defeat in Italian military history." John R. Schindler wrote "By any standard, Twelfth Isonzo [Caporetto] and its aftermath represented an unprecedented catastrophe for Italian arms." The disaster "came as a shock" and "triggered a search for scapegoats," culminating in a 1919 Italian military commission that investigated the causes of the debacle. At Rapallo, a Supreme War Council was created to improve Allied military co-operation and develop a common strategy. Luigi Cadorna was forced to resign after the defeat, a final straw according to the Prime Minister, Vittorio Emanuele Orlando. Cadorna was known to have maintained poor relations with the other generals on his staff and by the start of the battle, had sacked 217 generals, 255 colonels and 355 battalion commanders. 

In addition, he was detested by his troops as being too harsh. Cadorna had been directing the battle some  behind the front and retreated another  to Padua. Cadorna was replaced by Armando Diaz and Pietro Badoglio, who commanded one of the corps easily overwhelmed by the Germans in the early stages of the battle, but escaped from all charges during the commission hearings. Italian propaganda offices were established, promising land and social justice to soldiers. Italy also accepted a more cautious military strategy from this point on. Diaz concentrated his efforts on rebuilding his shattered forces while taking advantage of the national rejuvenation that had been spurred by invasion and defeat.

Casualties

Italian losses were enormous: 13,000 were killed, 30,000 wounded and 265,000–275,000 were taken prisoner. Morale was so low among the Italian troops, mainly due to Cadorna's harsh disciplinary regime, that most of these surrendered willingly. 3,152 artillery pieces, 3,000 machine guns and 1,712 mortars were lost, along with a vast amount of stores and equipment. In contrast, the Austro-Hungarians and Germans sustained between 20,000 and 70,000 casualties.

Subsequent operations
Up to this point the Italians had been left to fight on their own but, after the Battle of Caporetto, Britain and France sent reinforcements to the Italians. They were reinforced by six French infantry divisions and five British infantry divisions as well as sizeable air contingents. However, these troops played no role in stemming the advancing Germans and Austro-Hungarians, because they were deployed on the Mincio River, some  behind the Piave, as the British and French strategists did not believe the Piave line could be held.

The Piave served as a natural barrier where the Italians could establish a new defensive line, which was held during the subsequent Battle of the Piave River and later served as springboard for the Battle of Vittorio Veneto, where the Austro-Hungarian army was finally defeated after eleven days of resistance. On November 5, Allied officials came together at Rapallo to form the Supreme War Council.

Legacy

Opera Nazionale Combattenti, an Italian charitable organisation, was set up in December 1917 in the immediate aftermath of the battle, to provide assistance to veterans of the First World War; it was closed in 1977.

After the battle, the term "Caporetto" gained a particular resonance in Italy. It is used to denote a terrible defeat – the failed General Strike of 1922 by the socialists was referred to by Mussolini as the "Caporetto of Italian Socialism". Many years after the war, Caporetto was still being used to destroy the credibility of the liberal state.

The Battle of Caporetto has been the subject of a number of books. British writer and military historian Cyril Falls's one volume The Battle of Caporetto is an operational and tactical account of the battle as the centerpiece of the larger campaign in northeastern Italy. Infanterie greift an (Infantry Attacks), an interwar memoir and military handbook written by the future German field marshal Erwin Rommel, features the actions of then lieutenant Rommel and units he led during the battle, providing insight into "stormtrooper" tactics. The Swedish author F.J. Nordstedt (pseud. Christian Braw) wrote about the battle in his novel Caporetto. The bloody aftermath of Caporetto was vividly described by Ernest Hemingway in his novel A Farewell to Arms. Curzio Malaparte wrote an excoriation of the battle in his first book, Viva Caporetto, published in 1921. It was censored by the state and suppressed; it was finally published in 1980. The battle also features prominently in the novel Questa storia by Alessandro Baricco.

Today, a museum in the town of Kobarid is dedicated to the Isonzo Battles in general, and the Caporetto Battle in particular.

See also
 Italian prisoners of war in the First World War

Notes

References

Sources

Further reading

External links

 Anna Grillini: Caporetto, Battle of, in: 1914–1918 online. International Encyclopedia of the First World War.

Conflicts in 1917
1917 in Italy
1917 in Austria-Hungary
Modern history of Slovenia
Military history of Italy during World War I
Battles of World War I involving Italy
Battles of World War I involving Austria-Hungary
Battles of World War I involving Germany
Battles of the Italian Front
1910s in Slovenia
October 1917 events
November 1917 events
Battles of the Isonzo